Nelvin Solíz Escalante, nicknamed Masita (born November 3, 1989 in Cercado), is a retired Bolivian football (soccer) midfielder.

References

External links
 
 
 

1979 births
Living people
People from Tarija Department
Bolivian footballers
Association football wingers
The Strongest players
Club Atlético Ciclón players
Nacional Potosí players